INS Kadmatt (P29) is the second of four anti-submarine warfare corvettes built for the Indian Navy by the Garden Reach Shipbuilders and Engineers of Kolkata under Project 28. She was inducted into the Eastern Naval Command of the Indian Navy.

INS Kadmatt has been named after the Kadmat Island of India's Lakshadweep Islands and carries on the legacy of her predecessor INS Kadmatt (P 78), which served the Navy for 24 years from 23 December 1968 to 30 November 1992.

Design and Description
The primary role of the INS Kadmatt is in anti submarine warfare – to protect ships in convoys and ports from enemy submarine attacks. About 90 per cent of the ship is indigenous and has been designed by the Navy's in-house organisation, the Directorate of Naval Design and has been constructed using high grade steel (DMR 249A) produced in India.

It produces low levels of radiated underwater noise which reduces its chances of detection. It is equipped with a host of features including anti-aircraft guns, torpedoes and rocket launchers. The ship also has on-board early warning, navigation and fire control radars besides underwater sensors and integrated communication and electronic warfare systems.

The ASW-focused combat system includes four heavyweight torpedo tube launchers and a pair of 12-barreled RBU6000 rocket depth-charge launchers featuring several design improvements incorporated by Larsen & Toubro. It is not known if the locally developed Mareech anti-torpedo decoy system has been installed. The fire-control system is the Bharat Electronics IAC Mod C system. While the ships are fitted with a Humsa-NG bow-mounted sonar, an Atlas Elektronik towed array sonar set will be fitted in due course. The ship will also to be fitted with vertical launch surface-to-air missiles.

Kadmatt has a low radio, acoustic, magnetic and Infra Red(IR) signature owing to a 'X' shaped hull form, raft mounted engines and an IR suppression system. The IR suppression system reduces the heat emitted by the ship reducing the infrared signature thereby defending the ship from heat seeking missiles. It will be capable of operating under nuclear, biological and chemical war theaters, acting as a highly sophisticated front line warship of the Indian Navy.

Commissioning
The ship was delivered to the Indian Navy on 26 November 2015 and was commissioned on 7 January 2016 by Chief of the Naval Staff Admiral R K Dhowan at naval dockyard in Visakhapatnam.

Armament 
Kadmatt(P29) is equipped with a wide range of weapon systems. It is fitted with an OTO Melara 76 mm main gun, and uses two AK-630 guns and provision for 16-cell VLS launched Barak 1 missiles as close-in weapon system, which will be added later. In addition, 2 RBU-6000 anti-submarine rocket launchers and torpedo tubes capable of firing heavy weight torpedoes.

The sensors of this warship include the advanced bow mounted sonar and the indigenous 3D-CAR air-surveillance radar Revathi with capability to detect targets exceeding . It is also the first warship to be equipped with the Kavach decoy system for protection against anti-ship missiles. Like INS Kolkata, this warship is also commissioned without the critical medium-range surface-to-air missile (SAM) and advanced light towed array sonars (ALTAS), which is planned to be added later.

Gallery

See also 
INS Kavaratti

References 

Kamorta-class corvettes
Ships built in India
2011 ships
Corvettes of the Indian Navy